The Breheimsenteret is a museum and one of the three visitors centers for Jostedalsbreen National Park.

History
The center was generally open from 1 May until 1 October.  The center lay near to the glacier arm Nigardsbreen. The center contained a lot of information about the glacier and the Jostedal valley, which lies at the glacier's eastern edge. There is a  path to the lake Nigardsbrevatnet where a small boat takes tourists to the front of the Nigard glacier tongue. A bus leaves daily from Sogndal to the Nigard glacier and stops at the site where the center lay. It is called the "glacier bus".

In the evening of 28 July 2011, the building burned to the ground. The cause of the fire has not been determined. Plans have been made to rebuild the center by May 2013.

Monday 24 June 2013 the center was reopened by the Prime Minister of Norway, Jens Stoltenberg.

Media gallery

See also
Jostedalsbreen nasjonalparksenter

References

External links
 Breheimsenteret
 Breheimsenteret 
 Ice Troll tours
 Map of the area

Luster, Norway
Museums in Vestland
Natural history museums in Norway